Abdul Wahab Mumuni (born 6 July 1979), known professionally as Abdul Salis, is a British actor. He played paramedic Curtis Cooper on Casualty, the longest-running medical drama broadcast in the UK. he has 4 kids 3 biological and 1 step daughter his eldest daughter is called Mia, then his only son Cameron, youngest daughter Lyla and step daughter violet

Career

Television 
Salis has appeared in numerous television roles, including The Hidden City (2002), Casualty (2008–09), Trevor's World of Sport (2003) and an episode of Doctor Who "Fear Her" (2006) as Kel.  He was in an episode of CBBC's M.I. High "The Big Bling" as Ben Lacy (a footballer). In Father Brown (2019) S7:E2, "The Passing Bell", he played Enoch Rowe, an immigrant farm laborer from Trinidad. In January 2019, Salis played the role of Caden James in EastEnders.

In June 2020, Salis was announced to play Eamon Valda in Amazon's forthcoming The Wheel of Time. In 2022, he appeared as recurring character Sebastian in Catherine Tate's six-part mockumentary sitcom Hard Cell, released on Netflix.

Cinema 
His films include Love Actually (2003), Sahara (2005), Welcome Home (2004) and Animal (2004). Salis played the character Tony in the 2003 Richard Curtis film Love Actually. The 2006 movie Flyboys loosely portrayed aviation pioneer Eugene Jacques Bullard and his comrades from the Lafayette Flying Corps; Salis portrayed Eugene Skinner, a character based on Bullard.

Stage 
On stage he starred in Blood Wedding and The Road at the Orange Tree Theatre as well as Joe Guy at Tiata Fahodzi. He was in the 2006 production of The Exonerated in London's Riverside Studios. In 2010 he appeared as David Taylor in the stage production of War Horse at the New London Theatre. He performed the roles of Kwame / Simon / Wole in Barber Shop Chronicles (2018) by Inua Ellams, at the National Theatre.

Radio 
In May 2013, Salis played the role of Sable, Sump, Clarence & Homeless Man in a BBC radio adaptation of Neil Gaiman's Neverwhere, adapted by Dirk Maggs.

Video games 
He played the role of Joseph Morello in The Dark Pictures: The Devil in Me.

References

External links

Nell Frizzell, "Abdul Salis on acting in other languages and working in the round", Ideas Tap, 18 June 2014

1979 births
English male stage actors
Living people
Male actors from London
Black British male actors
English people of Ghanaian descent
English male television actors
21st-century English male actors